Van Tuyllpark is a RandstadRail station in Zoetermeer, the Netherlands.

History

The station opened on 19 May 2019, as part of the Oosterheemlijn extension to Lansingerland-Zoetermeer. The station is on a viaduct along the Prismalaan West

Train services
The following services currently call at Van Tuyllpark:

Gallery

References

RandstadRail stations in Zoetermeer
Railway stations opened in 2019